McKoy is a surname and is also a sept of Clan Mackay. Notable people with the surname include:
Millie and Christine McKoy (born 1851), siamese twins, "The Two-headed Nightingale"
David McKoy (born 1983), Canadian football player
Grainger McKoy (born 1947), American artist
Lorna McKoy, West Indian cricketer
Mark McKoy (born 1961), Canadian/Austrian hurdler
Nick McKoy (born 1986), English footballer
Noel McKoy, English soul singer
Olivia McKoy (born 1973), Jamaican javelin thrower
Wayne McKoy (born 1958), American basketball player